In topology, the pasting or gluing lemma, and sometimes the gluing rule, is an important result which says that two continuous functions can be "glued together" to create another continuous function. The lemma is implicit in the use of piecewise functions. For example, in the book Topology and Groupoids, where the condition given for the statement below is that  and 

The pasting lemma is crucial to the construction of the fundamental group or fundamental groupoid of a topological space; it allows one to concatenate continuous paths to create a new continuous path.

Formal statement

Let  be both closed (or both open) subsets of a topological space  such that , and let  also be a topological space. If  is continuous when restricted to both  and  then  is continuous.

This result allows one to take two continuous functions defined on closed (or open) subsets of a topological space and create a new one.

Then their union,  is also closed, being a finite union of closed sets.

The infinite analog of this result (where ) is not true for closed  For instance, the inclusion map  from the integers to the real line (with the integers equipped with the cofinite topology) is continuous when restricted to an integer, but the inverse image of a bounded open set in the reals with this map is at most a finite number of points, so not open in 

It is, however, true if the  form a locally finite collection since a union of locally finite closed sets is closed.

References

  
  
 Brown, Ronald; Topology and Groupoids (Booksurge) 2006 .

Theory of continuous functions
Theorems in topology